Dmitriy Bellman (Dmitry Vladimirovich Belman) (born 22 June 1977) is a Russian artist-jeweler

Biography 

Dmitriy Bellman was born into the family of Vladimir Bellman, an engineer of German origin. His mother is Janna Bellman. He is a graduate of the State Academy of Fine Arts, Tbilisi, Georgia (1999).

In 2008, Dmitry Bellman founded the Dmitry Bellman jewelry house.

He is a member of The Creative Union of Russian Artists, of The International Federation of Artists, and an academician of The International Academy of Creative Endeavors.

References 
Note: This article has been translated from its original Russian version at :ru:Дмитрий Бельман The list of references is therefore kept untranslated.
 «Ювелирный Олимп 2003», альбом, Санкт-Петербург, 2003 г., стр. 17.
 «Ювелирный Олимп, Юбилейное издание», альбом, Санкт-Петербург, 2006 г., стр. 8, 14, 135, 136. 
 «Современное искусство России», альбом, Москва, 2007 г., стр. 78-79, 200.
 «Москва 2008 - живопись, графика скульптура, артфото, актуальное искусство, дпи», каталог, Москва, 2008 г., стр. 172-173.
 «Путь единства», альбом, Москва, 2009 г., стр. 608-609.
 «Ювелирное обозрение», журнал, январь 2006 г., стр. 48.
 «Алмазы и золото России», журнал, №11, апрель 2006 г., стр. 81.

External links 
 Official website

Russian jewelry designers
Russian jewellers
Russian goldsmiths
1977 births
Living people